Cormocephalus lissadellensis is a species of centipede in the Scolopendridae family. It is endemic to Australia, and was first described in 1983 by L. E. Koch.

Distribution
The species is found in the Top End of the Northern Territory and eastern Queensland.

Behaviour
The centipedes are solitary terrestrial predators that inhabit plant litter, soil and rotting wood.

References

 

 
lissadellensis
Centipedes of Australia
Fauna of the Northern Territory
Fauna of Queensland
Animals described in 1983
Endemic fauna of Australia